This is a list of medical professionals who died during the SARS outbreak in 2003.

List

References 

2003 deaths
2003 in Hong Kong
Lists of health professionals
Deaths from the 2002–2004 SARS outbreak
Death-related lists